Drums and Wireless: BBC Radio Sessions 77–89 is a compilation album by the English rock band XTC, released by Windsong International in October 1994. It contains a selection of songs recorded for BBC radio between 1977-1989. Its tracks were later included on the 4-disc boxed set Transistor Blast: The Best of the BBC Sessions in 1998.

Critical reception

Chris Woodstra of AllMusic felt that the compilation "does a good job" of collecting most of XTC's BBC appearances, saying, "While many band's BBC sessions differ only slightly from the studio recordings, XTC was able to stretch out on their sessions for significantly different interpretations."

Track listing

Personnel
Credits adapted from the album's liner notes.

XTC
Andy Partridge – vocals, guitar, keyboards, zippy zither, drum programming
Colin Moulding – vocals, bass
Barry Andrews – keyboards (1977-1978)
Terry Chambers – drums (1977-1982)
Dave Gregory – guitar, keyboards, drum programming, vocals (1979-1989)  
Technical
Tony Wilson – producer (1, 8, 10, 11, 17)
John Sparrow – producer (2, 3, 15)
Dale Griffin – producer (4, 7)
Peter Watts – producer (5, 12, 16)
Malcolm Brown – producer (6, 9, 13, 14)
Dave Dade – engineer (1, 6, 8-10, 11, 13, 14, 17)
Mike Robinson – engineer (2, 3, 15) 
Ted De Bono – engineer (4, 5, 7, 12, 16)
Tim Durham – engineer (5, 12, 16)
Rian Hughes – design

References

External links 
 Allmusic review
 Discogs
 CD Universe

BBC Radio recordings
XTC compilation albums
1994 live albums
1994 compilation albums